Edoardo Pesce (born 12 September 1979) is an Italian actor.

Biography
A student of the actor Enzo Garinei, Pesce began his career on stage, but gained notoriety with the TV series Romanzo criminale and I Cesaroni.

He received critical acclaim for his performance of the violent thug Simoncino in Matteo Garrone's Dogman, for which he won the David di Donatello for Best Supporting Actor and tied a Nastro d'Argento for Best Actor with the protagonist Marcello Fonte.

Selected filmography

Film
 Viva l'Italia (2012)
 The Third Half (2013)
 God Willing (2015)
 Tommaso (2016)
 Fortunata (2017)
 Pure Hearts (2017)
 Dogman (2018)
 Io sono Mia (2019)
 Permette? Alberto Sordi (2020)
 The Time of Indifference (2020)
 The Guest Room (2021)

TV
 Romanzo criminale – La serie (2008–2010)
 Intelligence – Servizi & segreti (2009)
 Anna e i cinque (2011)
 Squadra antimafia – Palermo oggi (2013)
 I Cesaroni (2014)
 Christian (2022)
 Boris (2022)

References

External links
 
 

1979 births
Living people
Male actors from Rome
Italian male film actors
20th-century Italian male actors
21st-century Italian male actors